Channel Dinraat is a Bengali-language television station based at Melarmath in Agartala.

See also
 Santanu Bhowmik

References

External links

 

Bengali-language television channels in India
Mass media in Tripura
Television channels and stations established in 2017
2017 establishments in Tripura